Mechanophobia is a type of specific phobia that involves the fear of machines or anything mechanical. It emerged during the nineteenth century as a reaction to the effects of the Industrial Revolution. In the 1931 book Phobia by designer and artist John Vassos, mechanophobia is referred to as an affliction of the sexual incompetent or an economic misfit that view machines as symbols of power or achievement.

See also
List of phobias

References

Phobias